The CONCACAF Giants Cup was an international association football club competition held in 2001 to replace CONCACAF Cup Winners Cup. The cup was for CONCACAF teams with the highest attendance in their national league, and was won by Mexico's Club América. The winner and runner up was supposed to qualify for the CONCACAF Clubs Cup, a tournament of eight teams from the CONCACAF Champions Cup and Giants Cup that would compete each January for the FIFA Club World Championship. In October 2001, the Clubs Cup became the CONCACAF Champions' Cup 2002 and Club América and D.C. United were added to the competition.

First round

Bracket

Champion

Topscorers
Jorge Toledano (América) 3 goals
Martín Machón (Comunicaciones) 3 goals
Walter Centeno (Saprissa) 2 goals
Rolando Fonseca (Saprissa) 2 goals
Raúl Díaz Arce (D.C. United) 2 goals

External links
 RSSSF: FC Giants' Cup

Giants
Giant
Recurring sporting events established in 2001
Recurring events disestablished in 2001
2001 establishments in North America
2001 disestablishments in North America